The Vivacity 24 is a British trailerable sailboat that was designed by Alan F. Hill as a cruiser and first built in 1969.

Production
The design was built by Russell Marine in the United Kingdom, starting in 1969, but it is now out of production.

Design
The Vivacity 24 is a recreational keelboat, built predominantly of glassfibre, with wood trim. It has a masthead sloop rig; a spooned, raked stem; an angled transom, a skeg-mounted rudder controlled by a tiller and a fixed fin keel or optional twin keels. It displaces  and carries  of iron ballast.

The boat may be fitted with an inboard engine or a small  outboard motor for docking and manoeuvring.

The design has sleeping accommodation for five people, with a double "V"-berth in the bow cabin and drop-down dinette table in the main cabin. The galley is located on the port side just forward of the companionway ladder. The galley is "U"-shaped and is equipped with a stove and a sink. The head is located just aft of the bow cabin on the starboard side.

Operational history
In a 2010 review Steve Henkel wrote, "the Vivacity 24 is a relatively heavy and somewhat under-rigged coastal cruiser. Best features: The twin keeler sails and tracks well downwind. Worst features: Several owners say their Vivacity 24s are sluggish to windward and tend to pound in a chop. They also point out that their boats are under rigged for light air sailing conditions, and can benefit from additional light weather cruising chutes and foresails to keep them moving. But fully rigged in winds above 20 knots they can develop a nasty weather helm. Moral: reef at 15 knots."

In a 2017 review Go Sail noted, "the Vivacity 24 is a small solidly built small cruiser offering good safe coastal cruising with reasonable performance and well laid out accommodation for her size."

See also
List of sailing boat types

Related development
Vivacity 20

References

Keelboats
1960s sailboat type designs
Sailing yachts
Trailer sailers
Sailboat type designs by Alan F. Hill
Sailboat types built by Russell Marine